Gordon Douglas Morrison (15 May 1931 – 8 July 1972) was a Canadian alpine skier who competed in the 1952 Winter Olympics.

References

1931 births
1972 deaths
Canadian male alpine skiers
Olympic alpine skiers of Canada
Alpine skiers at the 1952 Winter Olympics